Eupinivora thaumantias is a species of moth of the family Tortricidae. It is found in Mexico.

The length of the forewings is 10–10.8 mm for males and 10–11 mm for females. The ground colour of the forewings is glossy cinnamon-rust with a narrow white longitudinal dash in the distal portion of the discal cell. The hindwings are pale grey.

The larvae probably feed on Pinus species.

Etymology
The species name is derived from Greek mythology, presumably from Thaumantias or Thaumantos, the daughter of Thaumas.

References

Moths described in 1994
Cochylini